Ices may refer to:

Frozen desserts
Frozen volatiles, in the context of astronomy and planetary science
Phases of ice

ICES may stand for:
Inflight Crew Escape System, in the Space Shuttle
Catholic Institute of Higher Studies (Institut Catholique d'Etudes Supérieures)
Institute for Computational Engineering and Sciences
Institution of Civil Engineering Surveyors
International Conference on Environmental Systems, an annual technical conference for human spaceflight technology
International Consumer Electronics Show
International Council for the Exploration of the Sea
Institute for Clinical Evaluative Sciences (ICES) – a health research institute in Ontario, Canada

Other uses:
IceS, a technical component of Icecast software
ICE S, a German high speed train
Lia Ices, American singer-songwriter
Ices (album), by Lia Ices, 2014

See also
Ice (disambiguation)
Isis (disambiguation)